Line M2 is the second line of the Warsaw Metro. It is 19 km long, has 18 stations and runs from Bródno neighborhood in Targówek district to the Ulrychów district in Wola. The planned line completion is in 2023, and will run from Targówek to Bemowo and number 21 stations.

The route of the M2 metro line was confirmed in 2006. In 2007 followed the announcement of a tender for the completion of the central section of the route from Wola to Praga. In 2008 the tender was cancelled due to exceeding offers and a new tender was announced. In 2009 the tender was complete and an agreement with the AGP Metro Polska consortium was signed. On 30 September 2014 the construction of the central section was complete and the final acceptance of the investment followed. The line opened on 4 March 2015.

In 2014 a tender was announced for the first extension "3+3", consisting of the completion of 3 stations in the west and 3 stations to the east of the existing central section. The tender was complete at the end of 2015 and an agreement for the completion of the eastern extension was signed at the start of 2016, followed in September by the signing of an agreement for the extension in the west. The opening of the eastern extension to Trocka occurred on 15 September 2019, and the western extension to Księcia Janusza on 4 April 2020. Bemowo and Ulrychów metro stations opened on 30 June 2022. The expansion to Zacisze, Kondratowicza and Bródno stations opened on 28 September 2022.

In 2016 Warsaw Metro chose the contractors of the second extension, known as "3+2", which included 3 stations in the east and 2 in the west. The extension was expanded to "3+5" instead. The planned completion of the extension is in 2023.

Planned extensions

First plans
The first plans presumed that following the completion of the central branch, an extension to Bemowo could be complete by 2017, and followed by an offshoot extension to Bródno by 2020. Following these proposals the Warsaw city council analysed the concept of extending the M2 metro line in both directions simultaneously although in smaller increments. It was assumed the extensions to Księcia Janusza and Trocka would be opened to public use by 2017.

Białołęka project
On 14 December 2011 the Białołęka district council adopted an official resolution for the alteration of the planned M2 metro line route. The resolution proposed the removal of the Bródno metro station by Kondratowicza and Rembiielińska streets. The new concept suggested the continuation of the line north past Kondratowicza street, routing the metro line to a newly proposed metro station by the Trasa Toruńska highway and Głębocka street.

In April 2013 the proposed M2 metro line extension was declined. The main allegations concerned inconsistencies between the projects and the provision of local spatial development plans and the lack of appropriate documents describing the impact of the investment on groundwater.

Return to initial extension concept
In June 2014, a new line expansion schedule was presented, which assumed that three more stations in both directions would be completed by 2018, and the next sections to Górce and Bródno stations would be built by 2020. It was assumed then that the construction of 11 metro stations over the course of 6 years would cost around 8 billion PLN. This meant that the metro would probably not decide to build a branch to Białołęka. In August 2014, an environmental decision was issued for the section towards Targówek, and at the end of September for the section in Wola.

Current stations

Future stations

References

Warsaw Metro lines
Railway lines opened in 2015
2015 establishments in Poland